Pictures is an album by Danish bassist Niels-Henning Ørsted Pedersen and keyboardist Kenneth Knudsen which was recorded in 1976 and released on the Danish SteepleChase label.

Track listing
All compositions by Kenneth Knudsen except where noted.
 "Skagen" - 2:36
 "School Song" (Niels-Henning Ørsted Pedersen) – 6:50
 "It's All There" - 11:10
 "Signal K" - 6:50
 "Afternoon's Sentiment" (Ørsted Pedersen) – 7:00
 "Daughters" - 4:07

Personnel
Niels-Henning Ørsted Pedersen – bass
Kenneth Knudsen – keyboards

References

1977 albums
Niels-Henning Ørsted Pedersen albums
SteepleChase Records albums
Collaborative albums